The Gardens Shul, formally, the Cape Town Hebrew Congregation, founded in 1841, located in the Cape Town Botanical Gardens, in the Gardens neighborhood of Cape Town, is the oldest Jewish congregation in South Africa.

The rabbi is Rabbi Feldman and the cantor is Choni Goldman.

The congregation, known as "The Mother Synagogue of South Africa," possesses two historic structures, the 1863 synagogue and the 1905 synagogue. The original 1849 building is no longer extant.

The synagogue grounds also house the South African Jewish Museum.

See also

 Oldest synagogues in the world
 Cape Town Holocaust Centre
 Jacob Gitlin Library

References

External links
 Home
 Fellner Travel Info.com
 Great Synagogue, Gardens, Cape Town
 

Ashkenazi Jewish culture in South Africa
Ashkenazi synagogues
Jews and Judaism in Cape Town
Orthodox Judaism in South Africa
Orthodox synagogues
Synagogues in South Africa
Religious organizations established in 1841
Synagogues completed in 1863
Synagogues completed in 1905
1841 establishments in the Cape Colony
Synagogues completed in 1849
19th-century religious buildings and structures in South Africa
20th-century religious buildings and structures in South Africa